Erlyne Antonella Ndembet is the Minister of Justice for Gabon.

Ndembet was born in Nantes in 1971.

References

Gabonese politicians
Living people
1971 births
21st-century Gabonese people